USCA Foot (Union Sportive de la Commune Urbaine d'Antananarivo) is a football club based in Antananarivo, Madagascar They won the THB Champions League and the Coupe de Madagascar in 2005 and were runners-up in the Coupe in 2004 and 2006. It also competed in the CAF Champions League 2006 beating SS Excelsior of Réunion and Mamelodi Sundowns of South Africa, but failed to qualify for the group stage after losing to Ghanaians Asante Kotoko.

Achievements
THB Champions League: 1
2005

Coupe de Madagascar: 1
2005

Performance in CAF competitions
CAF Champions League: 1 appearance
2006 – Second Round

CAF Confederation Cup: 1 appearance
2005 – First Round
2006 – Intermediate Round

Current squad

Football clubs in Madagascar